Virginie Le Brun (born 7 June 1980) is a New Zealand actress best known for her role as Dr. Gabrielle Jacobs in the TV series Shortland Street. She is the daughter of French parents, vintners Adele and Daniel Le Brun.

She played Elizabeth Frankenstein, the wife of Victor Frankenstein, in Stuart Beattie's 2014 film, I, Frankenstein.

Filmography

Films

Television

Short films

References

External links
 
Virginie Le Brun at the Official Shortland Street site

1980 births
Living people
New Zealand people of French descent
New Zealand television actresses
New Zealand soap opera actresses
People from the Marlborough Region
21st-century New Zealand actresses